The Mikoyan-Gurevich MiG-8 Utka ("duck") was a Soviet experimental aircraft. Built of wood, the aircraft was designed and built in 1945 to test the novel canard configuration. It also used a tricycle undercarriage, the first used by the OKB. It was modified to test a variety of vertical stabilizer and wingtip configurations and was later used as a liaison aircraft for many years by the design bureau.

Design and development
Nicknamed Utka ("duck"), as the word canard (referring to its small forward wing) is French for "duck", and with the Russian aeronautics term for a canard wing being described as a "duck" scheme (схема "утка"), the MiG-8 was an experimental aircraft designed and built by the OKB to evaluate the stability and handling of the canard configuration in conjunction with swept wings. This design has benefits in a jet-powered aircraft as it leaves the rear of the fuselage clear of interference from the jet's exhausts. To test the concept the MiG-8 was powered by a Shvetsov M-11 five-cylinder radial engine, with a pusher propeller.

Operational history
The aircraft was used as a testbed for developing the swept wing of the MiG-15, and afterwards continued to fly as a communications/utility aircraft for the OKB. Being made of wood and fabric, it was very light and reportedly a favorite among MiG OKB test pilots for its docile, slow-speed handling characteristics.

Specifications

See also

References

Bibliography
 Gordon, Yefim and Komissarov, Dmitry. OKB Mikoyan: A History of the Design Bureau and its Aircraft. Hinckley, England: Midland Publishing, 2009 
 Gunston, Bill. The Osprey Encyclopaedia of Russian Aircraft 1875–1995. London: Osprey, 1995

External links

 MiG-8 from aviation.ru
 MiG-8 from armscontrol.ru
 Archival film of MiG-8 winter rollout and takeoff

Canard aircraft
MiG-008
Single-engined pusher aircraft
1940s Soviet civil utility aircraft
1940s Soviet experimental aircraft
High-wing aircraft
Aircraft first flown in 1945